Lady Amelia Sophia Theodora Mary Margaret Windsor (born 24 August 1995) is an English fashion model and a member of the British royal family. She is currently 42nd in the line of succession to the British throne, as of September 2022. She is a granddaughter of Prince Edward, Duke of Kent.

Early life and family 
Amelia Sophia Theodora Mary Margaret Windsor was born on 24 August 1995 at the Rosie Hospital in Cambridge. She was christened in December 1995 at Chapel Royal, St James's Palace. She is the youngest child of George Windsor, Earl of St Andrews, and Sylvana Tomaselli. Her paternal grandfather, Prince Edward, Duke of Kent, is a first cousin of Elizabeth II and her father is a second cousin of Charles III. Her paternal great grandparents were Prince George, Duke of Kent, and Princess Marina of Greece and Denmark, a granddaughter of George I of Greece and first cousin of Prince Philip, Duke of Edinburgh. Her paternal great-great grandparents were George V and Mary of Teck. Her paternal grandmother, Katharine, Duchess of Kent, is the daughter of Sir William Worsley, 4th Baronet. Lady Amelia descends maternally from the Austrian Tomaselli family. She is the younger sister of Edward Windsor, Lord Downpatrick, and Lady Marina Windsor. She is a third cousin of William, Prince of Wales, and Prince Harry, Duke of Sussex. In 2013 she was presented to society at le Bal des débutantes.

Career 
Lady Amelia is signed with Storm Model Management. In 2016 she was the cover girl for Tatler. In February 2017 she walked the runway for Dolce & Gabbana at Milan Fashion Week. She also walked in Dolce & Gabbana's 2019 Spring collection. She was featured on the August 2017 cover of Vogue Japan. In 2018, Lady Amelia released a collaboration with Penelope Chilvers for a line of shoes, and modelled for the line in a video campaign in Spain. Twenty percent of the proceeds from her shoe collection were donated to War Child, a charity that aids children in conflict areas.

Lady Amelia has worked for Chanel, Azzedine Alaia, and interned at BVLGARI. She is a contributing fashion editor at Tatler.com. In October 2018 Lady Amelia became the spokesmodel for British make-up brand Illamasqua.

In 2020, Lady Amelia began contributing to a new environmental platform called Talia Collective, writing about eco-travel and lifestyle.

Succession rights 
Lady Amelia's father, the Earl of St Andrews, lost his succession rights to the British throne according to the Act of Settlement 1701 as a consequence of marrying a Catholic. Although her grandmother, the Duchess of Kent, had converted to Catholicism in 1994, it did not remove her grandfather, Prince Edward, from the line of succession as the duchess was Anglican at the time of their wedding in 1961. Her uncle, Lord Nicholas Windsor, converted to Catholicism in 2001, which removed him from the line of succession. In 2013, the Succession to the Crown Act was passed, granting Lady Amelia's father succession rights once again. Lady Amelia's two older siblings were confirmed in the Catholic faith and therefore lost their succession rights. She is therefore the only one among her siblings to maintain a position in the line of succession.

Personal life 
After graduating from St Mary's School, Ascot, Lady Amelia spent a gap year in India and Thailand before studying French and Italian at the University of Edinburgh.

Lady Amelia was named in the Vanity Fair International Best Dressed List in 2017. Further stylish looks were photographed in 2017.

In January 2021, she became the patron of Cross River Gorilla Project, an initiative that helps save the Critically Endangered Cross River gorillas from extinction.

References 

Living people
1995 births
Alumni of the University of Edinburgh
British debutantes
British women bloggers
Daughters of British earls
Debutantes of le Bal des débutantes
English bloggers
English female models
English people of Austrian descent
English people of German descent
English people of Russian descent
English socialites
Fashion influencers
Amelia
People educated at St Mary's School, Ascot